Acha Din is a 2015 Indian Malayalam-language action drama film written by Vijeesh A.C. and directed by G. Marthandan. The film stars Mammootty and Mansi Sharma.

Cast

 Mammootty as Durgaprasad
 Mansi Sharma as Sheethal
 Kishore as Antony Issac
 Renji Panicker as Homeminister Thomas Chacko
 Maniyanpilla Raju as SI Soman
 Kunchan as Gopi
 Padmaraj Ratheesh as Muneer
 Saju Navodaya as Police officer
 Sudheer Karamana as Anand
 P. Balachandran as Sir
 Yazir Saleem as Hussain
 Jaise Jose as Saidu
 Abu Salim as Joykuttan
 Chali Pala as Meeshakkaran
 Sethulakshmi as Ammachi
 Shaani Shaki as Anwar
 Hareesh Perumanna as Madanan
 Gokulan as Kamarajan
 Jayakrishnan as Doctor
 Moly Kannamaly as Moly
 Sabumon Abdusamad as Michael
 Pauly Valsan as Security man's wife
 Anjali Aneesh as Nurse
 Vivek Gopan as Doctor
 Pradeep Kottayam as CCTV Operator
 Gopalakrishnan as Health Inspector
 Bindu Anish as Antony's wife
 Swaminathan
 Arun
 Hariprashanth MG as Cameraman Dixon

Soundtrack
The film's background score and music is composed by Bijibal with lyrics written by Santhosh Varma.

References

External links

2015 films
2010s Malayalam-language films